Red October is another name for the October Revolution of 1917 in Russia.

Red October may also refer to:

Oktober Guard, a fictional special operations unit in G.I. Joe
Red October (malware), a piece of cyber espionage malware revealed in 2013
Red October (Philippines), also known as "Red October plot", an alleged rumor of ousting President Rodrigo Duterte from the office.

See also
The Hunt for Red October (disambiguation)
Krasny Oktyabr (disambiguation)
Krasnooktyabrsky (disambiguation)